This is a list of notable natives and long-term residents of New Haven, Connecticut, in alphabetical order.

Academics and educators

 Michael L.J. Apuzzo, academic neurosurgeon, surgical pioneer, editor, and educator
 Walter Darby Bannard, abstract painter and University of Miami professor
 Ida Barney, astronomer
 Harold Bloom, literature scholar and professor
 Edward Bouchet, physicist and first Black man to receive a Ph.D.
 Raymond C. Bowen, president of LaGuardia Community College
 Thom Brooks, political and legal philosopher
 Benjamin Woodbridge Dwight, educator and author
 Timothy Dwight IV, president of Yale College
 Josiah Willard Gibbs, mathematical physicist
 Ruth Wilson Gilmore, prison abolitionist and professor at The City University of New York
 William Henry Goodyear, archeologist, art historian and museum curator
 Arthur Twining Hadley, economist and president of Yale University
 Geoffrey Hartman, literature scholar and emeritus professor
 Stephen Kobasa, teacher, writer and Christian political activist
 William Chester Minor, lexicographer and key contributor to the Oxford English Dictionary
 John Nicholas Newman, mathematician
 James Pierpont, founder of Yale College
 David Pingree, professor of mathematics and classics
 Michael Resnik, philosopher of mathematics
 Vincent Scully, author and architecture professor, University of Miami and Yale University
 Lawrence Summers, economist and former U.S. Secretary of the Treasury and Harvard University president
 Peter Vallentyne, professor of philosophy
 Everard Mott Williams, scientist and educator

Actors and theater figures

 Lauren Ambrose, actress
 Tony Amendola, actor
 Jack Arnold, film director
 Jessica Blank, actor, playwright and novelist
 Roberts Blossom, actor and poet
 Ernest Borgnine, actor
 Melanie Chartoff, actress
 Martha Coolidge, film director
 D.J. Cotrona, actor
 Paul Fusco, puppeteer, actor and creator of ALF
 Marcus Giamatti, actor
 Paul Giamatti, actor
 Norman Lear, television producer
 Billy Lush, actor
 Biff McGuire, actor
 William Cameron Menzies, film production director and art director
 Becki Newton, actress
 Nolan North, voice actor
 Ron Palillo, actor 
 George O. Petrie, actor
 Thomas Sadoski, actor
 Patricia Smith, actress
 Jennifer von Mayrhauser, costume designer
 Rafer Weigel, actor and sportscaster
 Titus Welliver, actor
 Madeline Zima, actress
 D. J. Cotrona, actor

Artists and architects

 Peter Anton, artist and sculptor
 Hezekiah Augur, sculptor and inventor
 Henry Austin, architect
 Paul Wayland Bartlett, sculptor
 Al Capp, cartoonist
 August Geiger, architect
 John Haberle, painter
 Patrick Earl Hammie, painter
 Nathaniel Jocelyn, painter
 Damian Loeb, painter
 Tala Madani, artist
 Robert Moses, architect and urban planner
Samuel Peck, 19th-century photographer, businessperson
 César Pelli, architect
 Jesse Richards, artist and filmmaker
 Rudi Stern, light artist 
 Sidney Mason Stone, architect
 Ithiel Town, architect and civil engineer
 Nicholas Watson, filmmaker and artist

Athletes and athletics personnel

 Michael Altieri, pro wrestler performing under the name Mikey Batts
 Brad Ausmus (born 1969), American Major League Baseball catcher and manager
 Frank Beisler, hockey player
 Eric Boguniecki, hockey player
 Albie Booth, football player
 Craig Breslow, baseball pitcher
 Scott Burrell, basketball coach
 Walter Camp, football inventor
 Glenna Collett-Vare, golfer
 Tommy Corcoran, baseball shortstop
 Chad Dawson, boxer
 Harold Devine, boxer
 George Dixon, football running back
 Gardner Dow, football player
 Justin Duberman, hockey right winger
 Ed Ellis, football offensive tackle
 Adam Erne, hockey player
 Ed Etzel, Olympic sports shooter gold medalist
 Harrison Fitch, basketball player
 Kevin Gilbride, football coach
 Fred Goldsmith, baseball pitcher
 Jason Grabowski, baseball player
 Adam Greenberg, baseball outfielder
 Stu Griffing, rower
 Anttaj Hawthorne, football defensive tackle
 Jennison Heaton, bobsled racer
 Nate Hobgood-Chittick, football defensive tackle
 Richard Holliday, professional wrestler
 Matt Hussey, hockey centre
 Bill Hutchinson, baseball pitcher
 Bob Kuziel, football offensive lineman
 Floyd Little, football running back
 Brian Looney, baseball pitcher
 Ted Lowry, boxer
 Terrell Myers, basketball player
 Mike Olt, baseball player
 Ed Rapuano, umpire
 Anthony Sagnella, football defensive tackle
 Allen Stack, swimmer
 Greg Stokes, basketball player
 George Weiss, baseball executive
 Sly Williams, basketball player
 John Williamson, basketball player
 Josh Zeid, American-Israeli baseball player

Business figures

 Ted Bates, advertising executive
 Sarah Boone, inventor
 Wesley A. Clark, computer scientist and consultant
 Charles Goodyear, inventor and industrialist
 James J. Greco, businessman, was born in town
 Clifford Grodd (1924–2010), president and chief executive of Paul Stuart
 Paul MacCready, aeronautical engineer and inventor
 Andrew Paulson, entrepreneur and media executive
 Peter Schiff,  investment broker, author, financial commentator and CEO of Euro Pacific Capital Inc.
 Alfred Pritchard Sloan, Jr., businessman and CEO of General Motors
 Lucius Seymour Storrs, railway official
 Eli Whitney, inventor and manufacturer
 Steve Wynn, casino developer

Clergymen
 Charles C. Baldwin, Chief of Chaplains of the U.S. Air Force
 Lyman Beecher, clergyman and abolitionist
 Jonathan Edwards, pastor, theologian, missionary
 William H. Ferris, author, minister and scholar
 Michael J. McGivney, founder of the Knights of Columbus

Lawyers and jurists
 Roger Sherman Baldwin, lawyer, Amistad case
 Ellen Bree Burns, judge
 Lubbie Harper Jr., judge
 Maeve Kennedy McKean, lawyer and health official
 Constance Baker Motley, civil rights activist, judge, and politician
 Neil Thomas Proto, lawyer, teacher, lecturer, and author
 Martin Karl Reidinger, judge
 Thomas Thacher, lawyer

Military figures
 Timothy I. Ahern, major general
 Benedict Arnold, general who defected to the British
 William P. Cronan, naval officer and Naval Governor of Guam
 Nathan Hale, soldier and spy
 Henry Leavenworth, brigadier general
 Alfred Judson Force Moody, brigadier general
 Allen L. Seaman, naval officer
 Shabsa Mashkautsan, Russian Jewish World War II soldier, Hero of the Soviet Union

Musicians

 Ben Allison, jazz double bass player
 Sonny Berman, jazz trumpeter
 Michael Bolton, singer-songwriter
 Andrew Calhoun, folk singer, songwriter
 Karen (1950–1983) and Richard Carpenter (born 1946), singers and musicians 
 Loren Mazzacane Connors, musician and artist
 Susan DiBona, composer
 Dominic Frontiere, composer
 Anthony Geraci, blues and jazz pianist
 Jay Greenberg, composer
 Gerry Hemingway, jazz percussionist and composer
 Charles Ives, composer
 Michael Gregory Jackson, jazz guitarist
 Jamey Jasta, singer and guitarist
 Kris Jensen, singer and guitarist
 Pete Jolly, jazz pianist and accordionist
 Brooks Kerr, jazz pianist
 Hilly Michaels, musician and drummer
 Joe Morris, jazz guitarist
 Buddy Morrow, trombonist and bandleader
 Alfred Newman, Hollywood composer and conductor
 Troy Oliver, musician, songwriter and producer
 Liz Phair, singer-songwriter and guitarist
 Stacy Phillips, bluegrass artist 
 Quincy Porter, composer and music teacher
 Barney Rapp, bandleader and jazz musician
 Kira Roessler, bassist of Black Flag
 Emily Saliers, singer-songwriter and member of the Indigo Girls
 Christian Sands, jazz pianist
 Tony Scherr, bassist and guitarist musician, singer-songwriter and record producer
 Artie Shaw, bandleader
 Stezo, rapper
 Donn Trenner, jazz pianist and arranger
 Jessica Grace Wing, theatrical composer
 Barry Wood, singer and television producer

Politicians

 Katherine Clark, Democratic House Whip and U.S. Congresswoman
 Howard S. Baldwin, Arizona State Senator and businessman
 Roger Sherman Baldwin, lawyer in the Amistad case, U.S. Senator and 17th Governor of Connecticut
 George W. Bush, 43rd President of the United States
 Charles R. Chapman, mayor of Hartford, Connecticut and served in both houses of the Connecticut legislature
 William P. Cronan, naval officer and Naval Governor of Guam
 John C. Daniels, mayor of New Haven
 Rosa DeLauro, U.S. Congresswoman
 John DeStefano, Jr., mayor of New Haven
 Biagio DiLieto, mayor of New Haven
 Andy Dinniman, Pennsylvania State Senator
 Jerome F. Donovan, U.S. Congressman for New York
 Phineas C. Dummer, 6th mayor of Jersey City, New Jersey
 Henry W. Edwards,  27th and 29th Governor of Connecticut
 Foster Furcolo, U.S. Congressman and 60th Governor of Massachusetts
 Peter Franchot, 33rd Comptroller of Maryland 
 Henry Baldwin Harrison, 52nd Governor of Connecticut
 James Hillhouse, U.S. Congressman and U.S. Senator for Connecticut
 Thomas Hill Hubbard, U.S. Congressman for New York
 Charles Roberts Ingersoll, U.S. Congressman and 47th Governor of Connecticut
 Ralph Isaacs Ingersoll, U.S. Congressman and mayor of New Haven
 Joan R. Kemler, first woman to serve as Connecticut State Treasurer
 Eleazer Kimberly, in 1696 became Secretary of Connecticut Colony; "the first male born in New Haven"
 Richard C. Lee, mayor of New Haven
 Joe Lieberman, Connecticut Attorney General, U.S. Senator, and 2000 U.S. Vice Presidential candidate
 William D. Lindsley, U.S. Congressman for Ohio
 Frank Logue, mayor of New Haven
 Henry Meigs, U.S. Congressman for New York
 Bruce Morrison, U.S. Congressman for Connecticut
 George Lloyd Murphy, U.S. Senator for California and president of the Screen Actors Guild
 Mary Mushinsky, member of the Connecticut House of Representatives
 Gamaliel Painter, Vermont state legislator
 Henry E. Parker, Connecticut State Treasurer
 James P. Pigott, U.S. Congressman for Connecticut
 Adam Clayton Powell, Jr., U.S. Congressman for New York City
 Roger Sherman, first Mayor of New Haven, signed the Declaration of Independence and Constitution
 John Todd Trowbridge, member of the Wisconsin Territorial Legislature and sea captain 
 Rick Tuttle, Los Angeles city controller
 William H. Yale, 6th Lieutenant Governor of Minnesota

Writers
 Joseph Payne Brennan, poet and short story writer
 Hermann Broch, novelist
 Noah Charney, novelist and art historian
 William Cronon, environmental historian
 Dorothy Deming, nurse and author 
 John Falsey, television writer and producer
 Jeannine Hall Gailey, poet
 William Heffernan, novelist
 Burton J. Hendrick, journalist and writer
 Mary Austin Holley, 19th-century travel writer
 George W. Hotchkiss, 19th-century journalist, editor, historian, and lumber dealer
 Andrew Kopkind, journalist 
 Leigh Montville, sportswriter and author
 Ruth Ozeki, novelist
 Delia Lyman Porter, author
 Mark de Solla Price, author, journalist and activist
 Margaret Sidney, children's author
 Benjamin Spock, pediatrician and author
 Louisa Caroline Huggins Tuthill (1799–1879), children's book author
 Russell Wangersky, journalist and short story writer
 Leonard Weisgard, children's author and illustrator
 Bernard Wolfe, science fiction writer

Others
 Matt Amodio, Jeopardy! champion
 Michael Buckley, YouTube celebrity
 Perry DeAngelis, co-founder and executive director of NESS, co-founder of podcast The Skeptics' Guide to the Universe
 Scott Fellows, television producer 
 Louis Harris, pollster
 Bun Lai, sustainable sushi pioneer of Miya's
 Mary Blair Moody, physician
 Frank Pepe, pizza chef
 Madeline Triffon, sommelier

See also
 List of Yale University people
 List of Hopkins School people
 List of mayors of New Haven, Connecticut
 List of people from Connecticut
:Category:Lists of people by Connecticut municipalities

References

 
New Haven
New Haven